Ludwig Hofmann (9 June 1900 – 10 October 1935) was a German footballer. He was part of Germany's team for the 1928 Summer Olympics.

Career 
With his club Bayern Munich he reached three times the final matches of the German championships. Hofmann scored 4 times in 18 internationals for Germany.

References

External links
 
 
 

1900 births
1935 deaths
Footballers from Munich
German footballers
Germany international footballers
Olympic footballers of Germany
Footballers at the 1928 Summer Olympics
FC Bayern Munich footballers
German football managers
FC Bayern Munich managers
Association football midfielders